Leonel Duarte (17 April 1949 – 19 July 2013) was a Portuguese wrestler. He competed at the 1968 Summer Olympics, the 1972 Summer Olympics and the 1976 Summer Olympics.

References

External links
 

1949 births
2013 deaths
Portuguese male sport wrestlers
Olympic wrestlers of Portugal
Wrestlers at the 1968 Summer Olympics
Wrestlers at the 1972 Summer Olympics
Wrestlers at the 1976 Summer Olympics
Sportspeople from Shizuoka Prefecture